Riding Romance is a 1925 American silent Western film directed by J.P. McGowan and starring Al Hoxie, Marjorie Bonner and Steve Clemente.

Cast
 Al Hoxie as Lawton, the Stranger
 Marjorie Bonner as Beth Brandon
 Arthur Morrison as'Shotgun' Morgan
 Steve Clemente as Morgan Henchman
 Cliff Lyons as Jeff Brandon
 J.P. McGowan as John Brandon

References

Bibliography
 Langman, Larry. A Guide to Silent Westerns. Greenwood Publishing Group, 1992.
 McGowan, John J. J.P. McGowan: Biography of a Hollywood Pioneer. McFarland, 2005.

External links
 

1925 films
1925 Western (genre) films
American black-and-white films
Films directed by J. P. McGowan
Silent American Western (genre) films
1920s English-language films
1920s American films

iidhirjgjfirgjy